Brian Davie (born 31 August 1934) is  a former Australian rules footballer who played with Richmond in the Victorian Football League (VFL).

See also
 Australian football at the 1956 Summer Olympics

Notes

External links 
		

Living people
1934 births
Australian rules footballers from Victoria (Australia)
Richmond Football Club players
University Blacks Football Club players